An Zhengwen; (Date of birth and death unknown) was an imperial Chinese  painter during the Ming Dynasty (1368–1644).

An was born in Wuxi and was known for painting people, landscapes, and buildings.

Notes

References
 Zhongguo gu dai shu hua jian ding zu (中国古代书画鑑定组). 2000. Zhongguo hui hua quan ji (中国绘画全集). Zhongguo mei shu fen lei quan ji. Beijing: Wen wu chu ban she. Volume 10.

Ming dynasty landscape painters
Year of death unknown
Year of birth unknown
Painters from Wuxi